Prince Henri de Lorraine (1570-1600), count of Chaligny and marquis of Moy, was a French nobleman and a commander in the Catholic League during the French Wars of Religion.

Early life 
He was born at Nancy on 31 July 1570, the son of Nicolas, Duke of Mercœur, and his third wife, Catherine de Lorraine-Aumale (1550-1606).

Career
Henri began his military career in the service of Charles III, Duke of Lorraine, and rose to command the light cavalry that the duke sent in support of the Catholic League. In February 1589 he entered Rouen alongside Charles, Duke of Mayenne, and in the early 1590s fought with the Catholic League against the forces of Henry of Navarre. He was, embarrassingly, briefly the prisoner of Henry's fool, Chicot.

He went on to serve under his half-brother Philippe Emmanuel, Duke of Mercœur, both in France and later in the Long Turkish War.

He died in Vienna on 26 November 1600.

Marriage and descendants 
On 19 September 1585 he married Claude, marquise of Moy (1572–1627), with whom he had the following children:
 Charles (1592–1631), bishop of Verdun from 1611 to 1623
 Louise (1595–1667), who in 1608 married Florent (1588–1622), eldest son of Lamoral, 1st Prince of Ligne
 Henry (1596–1672), count of Chaligny and marquis of Moy
 François (1599–1671), bishop of Verdun from 1623 to 1661.

Sources 

1570 births
1600 deaths
Military personnel from Nancy, France
House of Lorraine
People of the French Wars of Religion
People of the Long Turkish War